Chalinze (Wilaya ya Chalinze in Swahili)  is one of nine administrative districts of Pwani Region in Tanzania. The district is comparable in size to the land area of Puerto Rico. Chalinze District is bordered to the northeast by Pangani District, the north by Handeni District and in Kilindi District of Tanga Region. The district is bordered to the east by the Indian Ocean. Chalinze is also borders Bagamoyo District, Kibaha Urban District and to the South by Kibaha District. On the western part,  the district is borderd by Mvomero District and Morogoro Rural District of Morogoro Region.

The district seat (capital) is the town and ward of Bwilingu. The district is named after the town of Chalinze it'self. The district is home to Tanzania's 5th President Jakaya Kikwete, who was born and raised in Msoga, Chalinze District. He was also a member of parliament of the district during his political career. The district was created from Bagamoyo District in July 2016.
According to the 2012 census, the district has a total population of 214,080.

Geography

Climate
Chalinze's climate falls under subtype "Aw" of the Koppen Climate Classification. (Climate of a Tropical Savanna).
Chalinze's yearly average temperature is 78.4°F (25.8°C). The average temperature for the warmest month is 82.0°F (27.8°C) in February. July has the lowest average temperature of any month, at 74.3°F (23.5°C).
Chalinze experiences 37.5" of precipitation on average per year (952.5 mm). With an average rainfall of 8.0" (203.2 mm), April is the month with the most precipitation. July has an average of 0.6" of precipitation, making it the month with the least amount (15.2 mm). The average number of days with precipitation is 108.0, with 16.3 days in April recording the highest total and June recording the lowest total.

History 
The area that is now Chalinze District has been inhabited by humans for thousands of years by Bantu peoples. The area is the ancestral home to three Bantu people groups, namely the Kwere, Doe people and the Zigua. The Zaramo are native to the southern portion of the district.

Administrative subdivisions
As of 2016, Chalinze District was administratively divided into 16 wards.

Wards

 Bwilingu
 Kerege
 Kibindu
 Kimange
 Kiwangwa
 Lugoba
 Mandera
 Mbwewe

 Miono
 Mkange
 Msata
 Msoga
 Pera
 Talawanda
 Ubenazomozi
 Vigwaza

Education & Health 
As of 2022, there were 142 Schools in Chalinze District, 112 of are primary schools and 30 are secondary schools. 
In Terms of Healthcare facilities, as of 2022 Chalinze district is home to 5 health centers and 39 clinics.

References

Districts of Pwani Region